Ismay may refer to:

People
Hastings Ismay, 1st Baron Ismay, British soldier and Chief of Staff during World War II
J. Bruce Ismay, managing director of the White Star Line and survivor of the Titanic disaster
Thomas Henry Ismay, father of Bruce, and founder of White Star Line
Stanley Ismay, British civil servant and judge in British India

Places
The town of Ismay, Montana